Holcopogon croesus is a moth in the family Autostichidae. It was described by the Hungarian entomologist László Anthony Gozmány in 2000. It is found in Lebanon.

References

Moths described in 2000
Holcopogon